Pierric is a commune in the Loire-Atlantique department in western France.

Geography
The river Chère forms all of the commune's northern border, then flows into the Vilaine.

Population

See also
Communes of the Loire-Atlantique department

References

Communes of Loire-Atlantique